Anu Sabhlok is an Indian architect, geographer and feminist scholar. Her main focus of work is on issues of identity and space in the context of a ‘developing world’. She earned a double Ph.D. in ‘Feminist Geography’ from Pennsylvania State University in 2007. Her doctoral work at Penn State focused on the role of women of the informal sector in construction(s) of identity amidst heightened nationalism and liberalisation of the economy in Gujarat, India.

Education 
Anu Sabhlok completed her bachelor's degree in architecture from the School of Planning and Architecture, New Delhi in 1995. She then went on to spend the next four years working in the field of architecture, with the last two years conducting research on policy. She graduated with an M.S. in architecture from Pennsylvania State University in 2001. In 2007, Anu received her dual Ph.D. in Geography and Women's Studies. Her doctoral work at Penn State focused on the role of women in the informal sector in construction(s) of identity amidst heightened nationalism and liberalization of the economy in Gujarat, India.

Career 
Sabhlok has been teaching as an associate professor at IISER, Mohali, since 2009. Prior to this, she worked as an assistant professor at University of Louisville, Department of Geography and Geosciences for a year. Sabhlok was also faculty at Pennsylvania State University, where she received her university education, from 1999 to 2002 and 2003–2006.

She has worked on three specific research projects:
 A feminist reading of the city of Chandigarh
 Constructing the Nation: An ethnographic account of migrant road builders at the Indo-Tibetan Border Roads
 SEWA in relief: Gendered Geographies of Disaster Relief in Gujarat, India (Doctoral work)
In 2002, she volunteered alongside and conducted ethnographic work on women relief workers in camps after the Hindu-Muslim riot. Her research area includes Postcolonial studies, feminist geography, Political-economy of contemporary India, Globalization, Identity (gender and nation), Participatory Action Research, Ethnography.

Awards

Publications 
 Brydon-Miller, M; Kral, M; Maguire, P; Noffke, S and Sabhlok, A. 2011. Jazz and the Banyan tree: Roots and Riffs in Participatory Action Research in Denzin, N (ed.) Handbook of Qualitative Research. Sage publications. 
 Sabhlok, A. 2010. Nationalism in relief. Geoforum. 41 (5): 743-751 
 Marshall, G and Sabhlok, A. 2009. “Not for the sake of work”: ultra-religious women's spatial negotiations in Turkey and India. Women Studies International Forum 32(6) 
 Sabhlok, A and Newton, J. Middle-East: Chapter 10. Address Earth, a large format atlas project. American Printing House for the Blind. (forthcoming) 
 Sabhlok, A. 2008. Integrated Disaster Management: an incentive for interstate cooperation amongst states in India. Man and Development: journal of the Center for Research in Rural and Industrial Development 30(4) 
 Sabhlok, A (as part of the 283 Collective). 2008. What's Just: Afterthoughts on the Summer Institute for the Geographies of Justice. Antipode 40(5) 
 Sabhlok, A. 2008. Book Review. Disaster Management in the wake of a flood. Punjab Geographer. 
 Sabhlok, A. 2005. Book review. Gender in the Hindu nation. Journal of international women’s studies 7(1) 
 Sabhlok, A. 2001. Chandigarh: A search for imageability within a modernist paradigm. Conference Documentation Set. International Making Cities Livable Council. California.

References

Year of birth missing (living people)
Living people
Indian women architects
21st-century Indian architects
Pennsylvania State University alumni
University of Louisville faculty
Pennsylvania State University faculty
Indian expatriates in the United States
Members of the Society of Woman Geographers